Cypripedium macranthos, the large-flowered cypripedium, is a species of orchid. It is  native to Belarus, Russia (European Russia and Siberia), Mongolia, Japan, Korea, Taiwan and China (Hebei, Heilongjiang, Jilin, Liaoning, Nei Mongol, Shandong).

References

External links
 
 

macranthos
Orchids of China
Orchids of Japan
Orchids of Korea
Orchids of Taiwan
Orchids of Russia
Plants described in 1800

Terrestrial orchids
Taxa named by Olof Swartz